Zhang Yangming (born 31 August 1994) is a Chinese alpine skier. He competed in the 2018 and 2022 Winter Olympics.

Career

2018 PyeongChang Winter Olympics

2019
In March 2019, Zhang fractured his tibia and fibula and had three steel nails inserted into his ankle after an accident while training in Austria.

2022 Beijing Winter Olympics
Zhang competed in all five men's individual alpine skiing events.

References

1994 births
Living people
Alpine skiers at the 2018 Winter Olympics
Alpine skiers at the 2022 Winter Olympics
Alpine skiers at the 2017 Asian Winter Games
Chinese male alpine skiers
Olympic alpine skiers of China
People from Tonghua
Skiers from Jilin
21st-century Chinese people